Ñuflo de Chávez is one of the fifteen provinces of the Bolivian Santa Cruz Department and is situated in the northern and central parts of the department. The name of the province honors the conquistador Ñuflo de Chaves (1518–1556) who founded the city of Santa Cruz de la Sierra. Its capital is  Concepción. The province was created by law of September 16, 1915, during  the presidency of Ismael Montes. Originally it was part of the Chiquitos Province.

Location 
Ñuflo de Chávez Province is located between 13° 45' and 17° 30' South and between 61° 30' and 63° 25' West. It extends over a length of 520 km from north to south, and up to 250 km from west to east.

The province is situated in the Bolivian lowlands and borders Beni Department in the north, Guarayos Province in the north-west, Obispo Santistevan Province and Ignacio Warnes Province in the south-west, Andrés Ibáñez Province and Chiquitos Province in the south, and José Miguel de Velasco Province in the east.

Division 
The province comprises six municipalities which are further subdivided into cantons:

Population 
The inhabitants of the Ñuflo de Chávez Province are mainly Chiquitos whose culture roots in the fusion of their ancient customs and the influence of the Jesuit missionaries. During the 2001 census the ethnic composition of the population was as follows:

The population of the province has increased by more than 100% over the recent two decades:
1992: 61,008 inhabitants (census)
2001: 93,997 inhabitants (census)
2005: 111,813 inhabitants (est.)
2010: 131,856 inhabitants (est.)

48.3% of the population are younger than 15 years old. (1992)

The literacy rate of the province is 72.6%.

87.3% of the population have no access to electricity, 50.4% have no sanitary facilities. (1992)

79.5% of the population are Catholics, 17.2% are Protestants. (1992)

In 1992 91.6% of the population spoke Spanish, 30.1% Quechua, 2.0% Aymara and 1.2 spoke Guaraní. During the 2001 census Spanish was spoken by 79,377 people, Quechua  by 20,763, Aymara by 1,362, Guarani by 1,002, other native languages by 3,619 and foreign languages by 5,617 people. The following table shows the number of speakers per municipality:

Economy 
The principal economic activities are devoted to animal husbandry, dairy farming, forestry and tourism. Another important occupation is handicraft like the fabrication of hammocks, textiles, hats, bags and baskets.

Environment 
Increased agricultural use of the land has led to deforestation in the area.

Gallery

See also 
 Jesuit Missions of Chiquitos

References

External links 
Population data (Spanish)
Social data (Spanish)
Mancomunidad de Municipios Chiquitanos (Spanish)

Provinces of Santa Cruz Department (Bolivia)